Oberstabsbootsmann (OStBtsm or OSB) is the highest Non-commissioned officer (NCO) rank in the German Navy. It is grouped as OR9 in NATO, equivalent to a Master Chief Petty Officer in the United States Navy, and a Warrant Officer Class 1 in the British Royal Navy.

In Navy context, NCOs of this rank were formally addressed as Herr/ Frau Oberstabsbootsmann also informally/ short Oberstaber.

The rank was introduced in the German Navy equivalent to the German Heer and German Luftwaffe grad Oberstabsfeldwebel in 1995, and belongs to the grad group Unteroffiziere mit Portepee.

The sequence of ranks (top-down approach) in that particular group is as follows:
Unteroffiziere mit Portepee
OR-9: Oberstabsbootsmann / Oberstabsfeldwebel
OR-8: Stabsbootsmann / Stabsfeldwebel
OR-7: Hauptbootsmann / Hauptfeldwebel
OR-6a: Oberbootsmann / Oberfeldwebel
OR-6b: Bootsmann / Feldwebel
Remark
The abbreviation "OR" stands for "Other Ranks / fr: sous-officiers et militaires du rang / ru:другие ранги, кроме офицероф"!

See also

Equivalent in other NATO countries
  – Maître principal-Chef (Oppermeester-Chef) and  Maître-principal (Oppermeester)
  – Chief Petty Officer of the Navy, Canadian Forces Chief Warrant Officer, and Chief Petty Officer 1st Class
  – Časnički namjesnik
  – Chefsergent
  – Major and Maître principal
  – Ανθυπασπιστής/ Anthypaspistis
  – Petty officer/ specialist
  – capo di prima classe
  – Adjudant-onderofficer
  – No Equivalent
  – Starszy chorąży sztabowy marynarki, Starszy chorąży marynarki
  – Sargento-mor
  – Suboficial mayor, Subteniente
  – Warrant Officer Class 1
  – Master Chief Petty Officer of the Navy, Command master chief petty officer, and Master chief petty officer
See also

History

Germany
The rank has never been used before by the Reichsmarine, the Kriegsmarine as well as in the GDR Volksmarine.

Austria-Hungary

Oberstabsbootsmann was the highest senior NCO-rank in the k.u.k. Austro-Hungarian Navy (1786 until 1918). It was equivalent to the ranks Stabsfeldwebel (Törzsörmester) / Stabswachtmeister / Stabsfeuerwerker / Stabsoberjäger of the  k.u.k. Common Army.

The sequence of ranks (top-down approach) in that particular group was as follows:
Oberstgabsbootsmann
Stabsbootsmann
Unterbootsmann

 See also

Sources/ references

Naval ranks of Germany